The women's doubles tournament of the 2019 BWF World Championships (World Badminton Championships) takes place from 19 to 25 August.

Seeds 

The seeding list is based on the World Rankings from 30 July 2019.

  Mayu Matsumoto / Wakana Nagahara (champions)
  Yuki Fukushima / Sayaka Hirota (final)
  Misaki Matsutomo / Ayaka Takahashi (quarterfinals)
  Chen Qingchen / Jia Yifan (quarterfinals)
  Greysia Polii / Apriyani Rahayu (semifinals)
  Lee So-hee / Shin Seung-chan (quarterfinals)
  Du Yue / Li Yinhui (semifinals)
  Shiho Tanaka / Koharu Yonemoto (quarterfinals)

  Kim So-yeong / Kong Hee-yong (third round)
  Gabriela Stoeva / Stefani Stoeva (third round)
  Jongkolphan Kititharakul / Rawinda Prajongjai (third round)
  Li Wenmei / Zheng Yu (third round)
  Chow Mei Kuan / Lee Meng Yean (third round)
  Della Destiara Haris / Rizki Amelia Pradipta (third round)
  Vivian Hoo Kah Mun / Yap Cheng Wen (third round)
  Maiken Fruergaard / Sara Thygesen (third round)

Draw

Finals

Top half

Section 1

Section 2

Bottom half

Section 3

Section 4

References

2019 BWF World Championships